The Eurovision Young Musicians 1984 was the second edition of the Eurovision Young Musicians, held at the Victoria Hall in Geneva, Switzerland on 22 May 1984. Organised by the European Broadcasting Union (EBU) and host broadcaster the Swiss Broadcasting Corporation (SRG SSR), musicians who could be no older than 19 years of age, from seven countries participated in the televised final hosted by Georges Kleinmann. They were all accompanied by the Roman Swiss Orchestra, conducted by Horst Stein.  and  made their début, while  withdrew from competition.

The Netherlands's Isabelle van Keulen won the contest, with Finland and the  placing second and third respectively.

Location

The Victoria Hall in Geneva, Switzerland, was the host venue for the 1984 edition of the Eurovision Young Musicians.

The concert hall located in downtown Geneva, Switzerland; was built between 1891–1894 by the architect John Camoletti and financed by the consul of England, Daniel Fitzgerald Packenham Barton, who dedicated it to Queen Victoria and gave it to the city of Geneva. Currently, the Victoria Hall is mostly used for classical music performances.

Format
 was the host of the 1984 contest. Each participating country were able to send male or female artists who were no older than 19 years of age, to represent them by playing a classical piece of their choice. They were all accompanied by the Roman Swiss Orchestra, which was conducted by Horst Stein. The winner received a cash prize of £1,000.

Results 
Awards were given to the top three countries. The table below highlights these using gold, silver, and bronze. The placing results of the remaining participants is unknown and never made public by the European Broadcasting Union.

Jury members
The jury members consisted of the following:

  – 
  – 
  – Marius Constant
  – Pierre Fournier
  – 
  – Jan Stulen (musical director of the  Eurovision Song Contest)
  – Aurèle Nicolet
  – Éric Tappy
  – Karl Engel
  – Pierre Métral
  – Alun Hoddinott
  – Yehudi Menuhin (head juror)
  – Carole Dawn Reinhart

Broadcasting
EBU members from the following countries broadcast the contest. Belgium and Yugoslavia broadcast the contest in addition to the competing countries.

See also
 Eurovision Song Contest 1984

Notes and references

Notes

References

External links 
 

Eurovision Young Musicians by year
1984 in music
1984 in Switzerland
Music festivals in Switzerland
Events in Geneva
May 1984 events in Europe